The Independence 20, also called the Freedom Independence 20, is an American trailerable sailboat, that was designed by Gary Mull as a class for disabled sailors and first built in 1999. The design is out of production.

The Independence 20 shares the same hull as the Catalina Yachts-built Aero 20.

Production
The boat was initially built by Tillotson Pearson in the United States for Freedom Yachts and later built by Catalina Yachts.

Design
The Independence 20 is a small recreational keelboat, built predominantly of fiberglass. It has a fractional sloop rig, a transom-hung rudder and a fixed fin keel. It displaces  and carries  of ballast.

The accommodation consists of two seats that are both pivoting and counterweighted, allowing side-to-side movement during tacking and gybing.

See also
List of sailing boat types

Related development
 Aero 20

References

Keelboats
1980s sailboat type designs
Sailing yachts
Trailer sailers
Sailboat type designs by Gary Mull
Sailboat types built by Pearson Yachts
Sailboat types built by Catalina Yachts